The Hill River is an ephemeral river located in the Mid North region of the Australian state of South Australia.

Course and features

Near the town of Spalding Hill River becomes a tributary of the Broughton River shortly before the Hutt merges also.

Flows which are intermittent, can result from either winter rains or local thunderstorms. Most of the catchment emanates from the Camels Hump Range and to a lesser degree from the Stony Range. Slab Hut Creek is amongst the more significant tributaries. The river has a low gradient which, combined with a broad and shallow catchment valley, renders it unsuitable as the site of any significant reservoir. In some areas the clearing of native vegetation has led to erosion and steep banks. The Hill River also gives its name to the locality of Hill River, which is within the District Council of Clare and Gilbert Valleys.

History

For over 100 years the date of European discovery and name origin for the river was confused. In the absence of proper research, several false attributions became accepted.  According to (incorrect) state government sources, the river was discovered by an obscure 'William' Hill in 1838 and named for Rowland Hill, the secretary of the South Australian Colonization Commission from 1833 until 1837.

According to Edward John Eyre, he discovered the river in 1839 and named it after explorer John Hill because he was "the gentleman who discovered its twin river, the Hutt". John Hill was the first European to explore the nearby Clare Valley. He sighted and named several important rivers of South Australia, including the adjacent Hutt River and Wakefield River. A 1908 news article conversely credits the obscure William Hill with naming Hill River after himself.

The issue was finally resolved in 2015 with the publication of John Hill : South Australia's Discoverer of Rivers, which emphatically concludes that Eyre discovered the river on 5 June 1839 and named it after John Hill, the explorer who discovered the Clare Valley

See also

Rivers of South Australia
 Polish Hill River, South Australia
 Hill River, South Australia
 Hilltown, South Australia

References

Rivers of South Australia
Mid North (South Australia)